The Factory is an album by Seven Nations, self-released in 1999.

Track listing
 The Factory Song
 This Season
 Soft Gator Girl
 The Ballad of Calvin Crozier
 Twelve
 The Paddy Set
 N.O.T. (I Want My People Back)
 Heroes in Tennis Shoes
 Sweet Orphan
 Mother Mary
 Daze of Grace
 This Season(reprise)

Seven Nations (band) albums
1999 albums